Karoline Seidler-Wranitzky (1790 – 7 December 1872) was a Czech operatic soprano. She notably created the role of Agathe in the world premiere of Carl Maria von Weber's Der Freischütz in 1821. She was the daughter of composer Anton Wranitzky and niece of composer Paul Wranitzky.

1790 births
1872 deaths
Czech operatic sopranos
19th-century Czech women opera singers